Lynn Schulman (born November 4, 1957) is an American politician who is a member of the New York City Council. She was elected in November 2021 to represent the 29th district, which includes all or parts of the Queens neighborhoods of Forest Hills, Rego Park, Kew Gardens, and Richmond Hill. Her term began on January 1, 2022.

Early life and education

Schulman was born in Queens, New York, and raised in the neighborhood of Forest Hills. She was educated in the New York City public school system, and her mother worked as a substitute teacher. She went on to graduate from New York University with a Bachelor of Arts degree in journalism and political science, and later from Brooklyn Law School with a Juris Doctor degree.

Schulman first became involved in politics when she campaigned for Bella Abzug, a member of the U.S. House of Representatives from New York seeking election to the Senate.

Career

Schulman, an attorney, worked in various government and healthcare nonprofit roles prior to her election to the City Council. In New York City government, she served in the mayoral administration of Ed Koch and the offices of New York City Councilwomen Carol Greitzer and Sara M. Gonzalez. Schulman also worked in New York State government as an aide to New York State Assemblyman William F. Passannante. Schulman was then employed at the HIV/AIDS services nonprofit GMHC, before she managed business affairs at the Woodhull Medical Center for over a decade. Afterward, Schulman returned to New York City government, where she worked in the Office of the New York City Council Speaker until her inauguration.

Schulman also held multiple volunteer public service roles in Forest Hills. She served as vice chair of Queens Community Board 6 and as a member of the 112th Precinct Council, District 28 Community Education Council, and the Board of Directors of the Forest Hills Chamber of Commerce. Schulman gained local notoriety for her healthcare advocacy, which she said "was born out of the HIV/AIDS movement" and later influenced by her breast cancer diagnosis during her 2021 City Council campaign.

Schulman ran unsuccessfully for the City Council in 2001 and 2009 in the same district that she now represents. The New York Times editorial board endorsed Schulman during her 2009 campaign, writing, "Ms. Schulman argues more powerfully for better access to schools and more affordable housing and health care."

2021 City Council campaign 
During Schulman's 2021 primary campaign for the vacant 29th City Council district seat, she received influential endorsements from the Working Families Party, LGBTQ Victory Fund, U.S. Representative Grace Meng, and labor unions including 1199 SEIU United Health Care Workers East, the Communications Workers of America, the Freelancers Union, and the Retail Wholesale and Department Store Union.

Schulman defeated eight other candidates in a June 2021 Democratic primary, the first cycle in which ranked choice voting was implemented in New York City. She received 60.0 percent of the vote in the final round, and the results were certified the following month by the New York City Board of Elections. Schulman then advanced to the November 2021 general election, in which she defeated one candidate running on the Republican and Conservative party lines to win the position.

New York City Council (2022–present) 
Schulman took office as a member of the New York City Council on January 1, 2022. She was named chair of the committee on health by Speaker Adrienne Adams soon after. Schulman also sits on the committees on aging, criminal justice, education, fire and emergency management, and governmental operations, as well as the subcommittee on zoning and franchises.

Schulman's primary legislative focuses have included increasing hospital capacity, protecting maternal rights, investing in green space, and improving government responses to public health crises, including the COVID-19 pandemic and the 2022-2023 monkeypox outbreak.

Schulman, who is Jewish and gay, is a member of the Jewish Caucus, LGBTQIA+ Caucus, and Women's Caucus.

References

New York City Council members
Women New York City Council members
New York (state) Democrats
Brooklyn Law School alumni
New York University alumni
People from Queens, New York
Politicians from Queens, New York
21st-century American women politicians
1957 births
Living people
American LGBT city council members
LGBT people from New York (state)